George John Montagu, 6th Earl of Sandwich (4 February 1773 – 21 May 1818) was the son of John Montagu, 5th Earl of Sandwich and Lady Mary Henrietta Powlett. He was styled Viscount Hinchingbrooke from 1790 until in 1814 when, his elder half-brother having died, he inherited the earldom from his father, together with the Hinchingbrooke estate in Huntingdonshire. He was educated at Eton College (1780-90) and  Trinity College, Cambridge (1790-92).

He was MP for Huntingdonshire from 1794 to 1814.

He married in 1804 Lady Louisa Mary Ann Julia Harriet Lowry-Corry, daughter of Armar Lowry-Corry, 1st Earl Belmore and Lady Harriet Hobart. Together they had two daughters and one son, John William, who would succeed his father in the earldom:
 Lady Harriet Mary Montagu (14 May 1805 – 4 May 1857), married William Bingham Baring, 2nd Baron Ashburton
 Lady Catherine Caroline Montagu (7 October 1808 – 30 April 1834), married Count Alexandre Colonna-Walewski, an illegitimate son of Napoleon I and Marie, Countess Walewska
 John Montagu, 7th Earl of Sandwich (8 November 1811 – 3 March 1884), married firstly Lady Mary Paget; married secondly Lady Blanche Egerton.

He died in Rome in 1818.

References 

 thepeerage.com Accessed 30 May 2007

External links 
 

1773 births
1818 deaths
People educated at Eton College
Alumni of Trinity College, Cambridge
George Montagu, 06th Earl of Sandwich
Hinchingbrooke, George Montagu, Viscount
British MPs 1790–1796
British MPs 1796–1800
Hinchingbrooke, George Montagu, Viscount
UK MPs 1801–1802
UK MPs 1802–1806
UK MPs 1806–1807
UK MPs 1807–1812
UK MPs 1812–1818
Sandwich, E6
Earls of Sandwich